A place-of-arms is any place in a fortification where troops can gather. The term has a number of meanings, but it generally refers to an enlarged area of the covertway designed as an assembly point for soldiers, or a square in the centre of a fortress, also known as a parade ground.

There are two types of places-of-arms:
Salient place-of-arms: a place-of-arms which protrudes outside the polygonal shape of the fortification
Re-entrant place-of-arms: a place-of-arms which does not protrude outside the polygonal shape of the fortification

References

Fortification (architectural elements)